The 1982 United States Senate election in Missouri was held on November 2, 1982. 

Incumbent Senator John Danforth was re-elected to a second term in office, defeating State Sen. Harriett Woods.

Republican primary

Candidates
 John Danforth, incumbent Senator
 Mel Hancock, State Representative from Springfield
 Gregory Hansman, perennial candidate
 Vernon Riehl, nominee for Missouri's 10th congressional district in 1950

Results

Democratic primary

Candidates
 Burleigh Arnold, Jefferson City banker
 Theodis Brown, Sr.
 Herb Fillmore, candidate for Senate in 1980
 Larry D. Hurt, Butler County resident
 Betty Jane Jackson, Pemiscot County resident
 Sidney L. Phillips
 Tom Ryan, consumer advocate from St. Louis
 Judith Soignet
 Lee C. Sutton, former State Representative from Columbia and candidate for Senate in 1980
 Harriett Woods, State Senator from University City
 Tom Zych, State Representative from St. Louis

Results

General election

Results

See also 
 1982 United States Senate elections

References 

1982
Missouri
United States Senate